Smash It Up: The Anthology 1976–1987 is a compilation album by the English punk and gothic rock band the Damned, released on 22 October 2002. It collects tracks spanning the first eleven years of the band's career, beginning with their debut single "New Rose" (1976) and continuing through their first seven studio albums—Damned Damned Damned (1977), Music for Pleasure (1977), Machine Gun Etiquette (1979), The Black Album (1980), Strawberries (1982), Phantasmagoria (1985), and Anything (1986)—along with the non-album singles "Stretcher Case Baby" (1977), "Lovely Money" (1982), and "Eloise" (1986).

Reception
Mark Deming of AllMusic gave the compilation four stars out of five, saying that it succeeds "for the most part" in presenting a coherent picture of the Damned's initial run, and that the chronologically ordered tracking portrays the group as "constantly growing and evolving, mutating from speed-addled punk marauders into a surprisingly radio-friendly blend of pop, goth, and hard rock at journey's end." While criticizing the inclusion of the 17-minute "Curtain Call" as desirable only to rabid fans, he remarked "this collection not only serves the band's history quite well, but also the evolution of their profile in the world of music from upstarts to veterans of the pop charts."

Track listing

Personnel
Band members
Dave Vanian – lead vocals on all tracks except "Silly Kids Games"
Brian James – guitar and backing vocals on tracks from "New Rose", Damned Damned Damned, "Stretcher Case Baby", and Music for Pleasure
Captain Sensible – bass guitar and backing vocals on tracks from "New Rose", Damned Damned Damned, "Stretcher Case Baby", and Music for Pleasure; guitar, keyboard, and backing vocals on tracks from Machine Gun Etiquette, The Black Album, "Lovely Money", and Strawberries; lead vocals on "Silly Kids Games"
Rat Scabies – drums and backing vocals on all tracks; guitar on "Drinking About My Baby"; synthesizer on tracks from Strawberries
Lu Edmonds – guitar on tracks from Music for Pleasure
Algy Ward – bass guitar and backing vocals on tracks from Machine Gun Etiquette
Paul Gray – bass guitar and backing vocals on tracks from The Black Album, "Lovely Money", and Strawberries
Roman Jugg – keyboard on tracks from Strawberries and Anything; guitar on tracks from Phantasmagoria, "Eloise", and Anything
Bryn Merrick – bass guitar and backing vocals on tracks from Phantasmagoria, "Eloise", and Anything

Additional musicians
Lol Coxhill – saxophone on tracks from Music for Pleasure
Vivian Stanshall – spoken word on "Lovely Money"
Andy Richards – keyboard on "Grimly Fiendish"
Luís Jardim – percussion on "Grimly Fiendish"
Gary Barnacle – saxophone on "Grimly Fiendish"

Production
Nick Lowe – producer of tracks from "New Rose" and Damned Damned Damned
Bazza – recording engineer of tracks from Damned Damned Damned
Shel Talmy – producer of "Stretcher Case Baby"
Roger Armstrong – producer of tracks from Music for Pleasure
Hans Zimmer – producer of "The History of the World (Part 1)"
Tony Mansfield – producer of "Lovely Money"
Hugh Jones – producer of tracks from Strawberries
Jon Kelly – producer of tracks from Phantasmagoria, "Eloise", and Anything

References

The Damned (band) albums
2002 compilation albums
Sanctuary Records compilation albums